Lora Petrova (born in Belene on 12 October 1998) is a Bulgarian footballer who plays as a midfielder for the Bulgaria women's national team.

International career
Petrova capped for Bulgaria at senior level in a 0–6 friendly loss to Croatia on 14 June 2019.

International goals

References

1998 births
Living people
People from Pleven Province
Bulgarian women's footballers
Women's association football midfielders
FC NSA Sofia players
Bulgaria women's international footballers
21st-century Bulgarian women